Karolina Hamer (born 12 February 1981) is a Polish Paralympic swimmer who competes in international level events. She is also a disability rights activist.

Personal life
In 2018 she publicly came out as bisexual becoming the first active Polish sportswoman to do so.

References

1981 births
Living people
People from Tychy
Paralympic swimmers of Poland
Polish LGBT sportspeople
Swimmers at the 2004 Summer Paralympics
Swimmers at the 2008 Summer Paralympics
Swimmers at the 2012 Summer Paralympics
Swimmers at the 2016 Summer Paralympics
Medalists at the World Para Swimming Championships
S4-classified Paralympic swimmers
Bisexual sportspeople